The London Agreement may refer to one of the following agreements signed in London:

 The Anglo-German Naval Agreement (1935), which regulated the size of the Kriegsmarine in relation to the Royal Navy
 The London Charter of the International Military Tribunal (1945), which set down the laws and procedures by which the Nuremberg trials were to be conducted
 The London Agreement of 1949, which established the International Authority for the Ruhr
 The London Agreement on German External Debts (1953)
The London-Zürich Agreements (1959), regarding Cyprus
 The Peres–Hussein London Agreement (1987), signed by Shimon Peres and King Hussein of Jordan
 The London Agreement (2000), which relates to the language provisions under the European Patent Convention

See also
 London Declaration (disambiguation)
 London Protocol (disambiguation)
 List of conferences in London
 Treaty of London (disambiguation)

London-related lists
Lists of treaties